Émile Nelligan (December 24, 1879 – November 18, 1941) was a Canadian Symbolist poet from Montreal who wrote in French. Even though he stopped writing poetry after being institutionalized at the age of 19, Nelligan remains an iconic figure in Quebec culture and was considered by Edmund Wilson to be the greatest Canadian poet in any language.

Biography
Nelligan was born in Montreal on December 24, 1879, at 602, rue de La Gauchetière (Annuaire Lovell's de 1879). He was the first son of David Nelligan, who arrived in Quebec from Dublin, Ireland at the age of 12. His mother was Émilie Amanda Hudon, from Rimouski, Quebec. He had two sisters, Béatrice and Gertrude.

A follower of Symbolism, he produced poetry profoundly influenced by Octave Crémazie, Louis Fréchette, Charles Baudelaire, Paul Verlaine, Georges Rodenbach, Maurice Rollinat and Edgar Allan Poe. A precocious talent like Arthur Rimbaud, he published his first poems in Montreal at the age of 16.

In 1899, Nelligan began to exhibit odd behavior. He was said to have loudly recited poetry to passing strangers and slept in chapels. He was also experiencing hallucinations and he attempted suicide. He was committed to a mental hospital at the request of his parents. There he was diagnosed with dementia praecox (now more commonly referred to as schizophrenia). He did not write any poetry after being hospitalized.

At the time, rumor and speculation suggested that he went insane because of the vast cultural and language differences between his mother and father. In recent years, however, a number of literary critics have theorized that Nelligan may have been gay. Some of these sources allege that he became mentally ill due to inner conflict between his sexual orientation and his Catholic Faith, while others suggest that he was never insane at all, but was involuntarily committed to the asylum by his family to escape the stigma of his alleged sexual orientation. No biographical sources published during Nelligan's lifetime contain any confirmed record of Nelligan having had any sexual or romantic relationships with either men or women, although some posthumous biographers have suggested that he may have been the lover of poet Arthur de Bussières. Within the École littéraire de Montréal circle with which both Nelligan and Bussières were associated, it was believed that Nelligan was confined to the asylum because his mother discovered him and Bussières in bed together, although this allegation was not widely publicized until the late 20th century and remains unproven. Conversely, the 1991 biographical film Nelligan depicts Nelligan as a celibate bisexual, portraying him as sexually ambivalent in the face of romantic attractions to both Bussières and feminist activist Idola Saint-Jean, and implying that his mother attempted to commit incest with him.

In 1903, his collected poems were published to great acclaim in Canada. He may not have been aware that he was counted among French Canada's greatest poets.

On his death in 1941, Nelligan was interred in the Cimetière Notre-Dame-des-Neiges in Montreal, Quebec. Following his death, the public became increasingly interested in Nelligan. His incomplete work spawned a kind of romantic legend. He was first translated into English in 1960 by P.F. Widdows. In 1983, Fred Cogswell translated all his poems in The Complete Poems of Émile Nelligan. In the fall of 2017, Montreal's Vehicle Press will be releasing Marc di Saverio's English translations of Nelligan, Ship of Gold: The Essential Poems of Emile Nelligan.

Nelligan is considered one of the greatest poets of French Canada. Several schools and libraries in Quebec are named after him, and Hotel Nelligan is a four-star hotel in Old Montreal at the corner of Rue St. Paul and Rue St. Sulpice.

In her 2013 book Le Naufragé du Vaisseau d'or, Yvette Francoli claimed that Louis Dantin, the publisher of Nelligan's poems, was in fact their real author. This claim was also previously advanced by Claude-Henri Grignon in his 1936 essay Les Pamphlets de Valdombre, although Dantin himself denied having had anything more than an editing role in the poems' creation. In 2016, the University of Ottawa's literary journal Analyses published an article by Annette Hayward and Christian Vandendorpe which rejected the claim, based on textual comparisons of the poetry credited to Nelligan with the writings of Dantin.

Le Vaisseau d'Or 

English-language translation/adaptation for "Nelligan, the Musical" by Michel Tremblay and Andre Gagnon

A vessel of great might /
Was hewn of solid gold /
Masts billowed in the air /
On seas beyond compare

There Venus came in sight /
Bare-skinned with tousled hair /
Spread upon the prow for sunlight to behold

But then came fateful night /
A great reef sealed her doom /
In the deceiving ocean /
Wherein sirens sing

Her hull was tilted forth /
The wreck slipped tapering /
Down to the chasm's depths /
Toward a silent tomb

A vessel hewn of gold /
Diaphanous as air /
Revealed its treasure hold /
To vulgar sailors, there

Disgust and Hate and Fear /
Amongst themselves did rage /

The vessel's gone amiss /
In sudden storm it seems /
What's happened to my heart, lost on the thankless waves? /

Alas! It sank into the dark abyss... of dreams

Christ en Croix

Je remarquais toujours ce grand Jésus de plâtre
Dressé comme un pardon au seuil du vieux couvent,
Échafaud solennel à geste noir, devant
Lequel je me courbais, saintement idolâtre.

Or, l'autre soir, à l'heure où le cri-cri folâtre,
Par les prés assombris, le regard bleu rêvant,
Récitant Eloa, les cheveux dans le vent,
Comme il sied à l'Éphèbe esthétique et bellâtre,

J'aperçus, adjoignant des débris de parois,
Un gigantesque amas de lourde vieille croix
Et de plâtre écroulé parmi les primevères;

Et je restai là, morne, avec les yeux pensifs,
Et j'entendais en moi des marteaux convulsifs
Renfoncer les clous noirs des intimes Calvaires!

Translation by Konrad Bongard

The gypsum Jesus always stalled me in my stepsLike a curse at the old convent door;Crouching meekly, I bend to exalt an idolWhose forgiveness I do not implore.

Not long ago, at the crickets' hour, I roamed dimMeadows in a restful reverieReciting 'Eloa', with my hair worn by the windAnd no audience save for the trees.

But now, as I lie with knees bent beneath Christ's scaffold,I see his crumbling mortar crossWith its plaster buried in the roses, and am saddened -

For if I listen close enough, I can almost hearThe sound of coal-black nails being wrung inTo his wrists, the savage piercing of Longinus' spear.

Tribute 

Several schools and libraries of Quebec bear the name of Émile Nelligan. Since 1979 the Prix Émile-Nelligan has rewarded the authors of a French-language poetry book written by a young poet in North America.

On June 7, 2005, the Fondation Émile-Nelligan and the City of Montreal inaugurated a bust to his memory in the Carré Saint-Louis. Another monument to his memory stands in Quebec City.

The poetry of Nelligan inspired numerous music composers:

 André Gagnon. Nelligan, Toronto: Disques SRC, 2005, 2 disks (Concert recorded at the Salle Wilfrid-Pelletier of the Place des Arts in Montréal, on February 18 and 19 2005)
 Gilbert Patenaude. Compagnons des Amériques : poètes québécois mis en musique, Montréal: Disques XXI, 2005, 1 disk
 Jean Chatillon. Clair de lune sur les eaux du rêve, Bécancour: Éditions de l'Écureuil noir, 2001 (1 disk)
 Jacques Hétu. Le tombeau de Nelligan : mouvement symphonique opus 52, Saint-Nicolas: Doberman-Yppan, 1995 (1 partition: 44 pages)
 John Craton.  Jardin sentimental : Cinq poèmes d'Émile Nelligan, Bedford, Ind: Wolfhead Music, 2004, 18 pages.
 André Gagnon and Claude Léveillée. Monique Leyrac chante Emile Nelligan, Verdun: Disques Mérite, 1991, 1 disk
 André Gagnon. Nelligan : livret d'opéra, Montréal: Leméac, 1990, 90 pages (text by Michel Tremblay)
 Jacques Hétu. Les abîmes du rêve : opus 36, Montréal: Sociéte nouvelle d'enregistrement, 1987, duration 30:21
 Richard G. Boucher. Anges maudits, veuillez m'aider! : cantate dramatique sur des poèmes d'Émile Nelligan, Montréal: Radio Canada international, 1981, duration 38 min.
 Omer Létourneau. Violon de villanelle : choeur pour voix de femmes, Québec: Procure générale de musique enr., 1940 (1 partition: 8 pages)

Selected bibliography

Collections
 1903 - Émile Nelligan et son œuvre, Montréal: Beauchemin (Louis Dantin) online
 1952 - Poésies complètes : 1896-1899, Montréal: Fides (Luc Lacourcière)
 1966 - Poèmes choisis, Montréal: Fides (Eloi de Grandmont)
 1980 - Poèmes choisis, Montréal: Fides (Roger Chamberland)
 1982 - 31 Poèmes autographes : 2 carnets d'hôpital, 1938, Trois-Rivières: Forges
 1991 - Le Récital des anges : 50 poèmes d'Émile Nelligan, Trois-Rivières: Forges (Claude Beausoleil)
 1991 - Oeuvres complètes, Montréal: Fides, 2 volumes (Réjean Robidoux and Paul Wyczynski)
 1991 - Poèmes autographes, Montréal: Fides, 1991, (Paul Wyczynski)
 1995 - Poésie en version originale, Montréal: Triptyque (André Marquis)
 1997 - Poèmes choisis : le récital de l'ange, Saint-Hippolyte: Noroît (Jocelyne Felx)
 1998 - Poésies complètes, La Table Ronde: Paris, 1998
 2004 - Poésies complètes, 1896-1941, Montréal: Fides (text established, annotated and presented by Réjean Robidoux and Paul Wyczynski)
 2006 - Oeuvres complètes, Montréal: Bibliothèque québécoise (critical edition by Jacques Michon, reviewed, corrected and augmented by André Gervais in collaboration with Jacques Michon)
 2020 – Émile Nelligan et son œuvre, Québec, Codicille éditeur (« Bibliothèque mobile de littérature québécoise »). (HTML)

In translation

 Selected Poems - 1960 (translated by P. F. Widdows)
 The Complete Poems of Emile Nelligan - 1982 (translated by Fred Cogswell)
 Ship of Gold: The Essential Poems of Emile Nelligan - 2017 (translated by Marc di Saverio)

Musical adaptations
 American classical composer John Craton utilized five of Nelligan's poems in the song cycle Jardin sentimental (2004).
 In 1946, Watson Kirkconnell published a literary translation of Émile Nelligan's sonnet Devant deux Portraits de ma Mère ("Before Two Portraits of My Mother").

References

In English 
 Nina Milner. "Émile Nelligan (1879-1941)", in Canadian Poetry Archive, November 28, 2003
 Talbot, Emile (2002). Reading Nelligan, Montreal: McGill-Queen's University Press, 221 p. 
 Fred Cogswell (1983). The Complete Poems of Émile Nelligan, Montréal: Harvest House, 120 p. 
 P.F. Widdows (1960). Selected Poems by Émile Nelligan, Toronto: Ryerson, 39 p.

In French 

On his work and life

 Sui Caedere, "Thrène" (2009). Music album is a tribute to Quebec's damned poet Émile Nelligan, a man who saw beyond the dream, beyond the paradox of life. Contains 9 haunting tracks.
 Lemieux, Pierre Hervé (2004). Nelligan et Françoise : l'intrigue amoureuse la plus singulière de la fin du 19e siècle québécois : biographie reconstituée à l'occasion du centième anniversiare de la publication du recueil de poésie d'Émile Nelligan, 1904-2004, Lévis: Fondation littéraire Fleur de lys, 537 p. 
 Wyczynski, Paul (2002). Album Nelligan : une biographie en images, Saint-Laurent: Fides, 2002, 435 pages 
 Wyczynski, Paul (1999). Émile Nelligan : biographie, Saint-Laurent: Bibliothèque Québécoise, 1999, 345 p.  (édition originale : Nelligan, 1879-1941, Montréal: Fides, 1987)
 Beausoleil, Claude. "Émile Nelligan et le temps", in Nuit blanche, numero 74, Spring 1999
 Beaudoin, Réjean (1997). Une Étude des Poésies d'Émile Nelligan, Montréal: Boréal, 106 p.
 Vanasse, André (1996). Émile Nelligan, le spasme de vivre, Montréal: XYZ, 201 p.  (biographie romancée)
 Lemieux, Pierre H. "La nouvelle édition critique de Nelligan", in Lettres québécoises, numero 66, Summer 1992
 Whitfield, Agnès (1988). "Nelligan, de l'homme à l'œuvre", in Lettres québécoises, numéro 49, Spring 1988
 Bertrand, Réal (1980). Émile Nelligan, Montréal: Lidec, 62 p. 
 Wyczynski, Paul (1973). Bibliographie descriptive et critique d'Emile Nelligan, Ottawa : Editions de l'Université d'Ottawa, 319 p. 
 Wyczynski, Paul (1965). Poésie et symbole : perspectives du symbolisme : Emile Nelligan, Saint-Denys Garneau, Anne Hébert : le langage des arbres, 	Montréal: Librairie Déom, 252 p.
 Wyczynski, Paul (1960). Émile Nelligan : sources et originalité de son oeuvre, Ottawa: Éditions de l'Université d'Ottawa, 349 p.

External links

 Fondation Émile Nelligan
 English translation of La Romance du Vin
 
 

1879 births
1941 deaths
20th-century Canadian poets
20th-century Canadian male writers
Burials at Notre Dame des Neiges Cemetery
Canadian male poets
Canadian Roman Catholics
Canadian poets in French
Canadian people of Irish descent
Francophone Quebec people
People with schizophrenia
Persons of National Historic Significance (Canada)
Poètes maudits
Quebec people of Irish descent
Sonneteers
Symbolist poets
Writers from Montreal
Collège de Montréal alumni